Pilot Knob is a  mountain summit located on the shared boundary of San Juan County with San Miguel County, in southwest Colorado, United States. It is situated nine miles west of the community of Silverton, on land managed by San Juan National Forest and Uncompahgre National Forest. Pilot Knob is part of the San Juan Mountains which are a subset of the Rocky Mountains, and is west of the Continental Divide. Neighbors include Ulysses S Grant Peak 1.5 mile to the northeast, and Golden Horn one-half mile to the southeast. The mountain's name, which has been officially adopted by the United States Board on Geographic Names, was listed by Henry Gannett when he published A Gazetteer of Colorado in 1906. The peak is considered one of the most difficult to climb in Colorado because of its poor quality volcanic rock.

Climate 
According to the Köppen climate classification system, Pilot Knob is located in an alpine subarctic climate zone with long, cold, snowy winters, and cool to warm summers. Due to its altitude, it receives precipitation all year, as snow in winter, and as thunderstorms in summer, with a dry period in late spring. Precipitation runoff from the mountain drains west into tributaries of the San Miguel River, and east to the Animas River via Mineral Creek.

Gallery

See also

References

External links 
 Weather forecast: National Weather Service

Mountains of San Miguel County, Colorado
Mountains of San Juan County, Colorado
San Juan Mountains (Colorado)
Mountains of Colorado
North American 4000 m summits
San Juan National Forest
Uncompahgre National Forest